The 1998 OFC Nations Cup was an international football tournament that was held in Brisbane, Australia from 25 September to 4 October 1998. The 6 national teams involved in the tournament were required to register a squad of players; only players in these squads were eligible to take part in the tournament.  The 1998 Melanesia Cup and the 1998 Polynesia Cup were used to find the four qualifiers for the finals tournament (Fiji and Vanuatu from Melanesia and Tahiti and Cook Islands from Polynesia respectively), to move on and join Australia and New Zealand at the main tournament.

Players marked (c) were named as captain for their national squad. Players' club teams and players' age are as of 25 September 1998 – the tournament's opening day.

Squad lists

Australia
Coach:  Raul Blanco

Cook Islands
Coach: Alex Napa

Fiji
Coach: Billy Singh

New Zealand
Coach:  Ken Dugdale

Tahiti
Coach: Alain Rousseau and Eddy Rousseau

Vanuatu
Coach: Alwyn Job

References

squads
OFC Nations Cup squads